Events in the year 1986 in Germany.

Incumbents
President - Richard von Weizsäcker
Chancellor – Helmut Kohl

Events
 14 - 25 February - 36th Berlin International Film Festival
 27 March - Germany in the Eurovision Song Contest 1986
 8 June - East German general election, 1986
 July - Launch of the second generation BMW 7 Series.
 September - Launch of the third generation Audi 80.
17 October - Launch of the all-new Opel Omega, which succeeds the Opel Rekord.
December - The Opel Omega is voted European Car of the Year, with the Audi 80 coming second in the contest and the BMW 7 Series coming third.
 German company Volkswagen Group acquired a controlling stake in Spanish company SEAT.

Births

January
6 January – Benjamin Simm, rugby player
13 January – Laura Ludwig, Olympic beach volleyball player

February

March
5 March – Constantin von Jascheroff, actor
27 March – Manuel Neuer, footballer

April
11 April – Lena Schöneborn, Olympic pentathlete

May

June
4 June – Fahriye Evcen, German-born Turkish actress
5 June – Christian Baracat, rugby player
11 June – Sebastian Bayer, Olympic long jumper

July
20 July – Andreas Kümmert, singer
25 July – Robert Dietrich, ice hockey player (d. 2011)
30 July – Arthur Abele, Olympic decathlete

August
7 August – Paul Biedermann, Olympic swimmer
17 August – Tobias Schönenberg, actor and model
26 August – Kerstin Thiele, Olympic judoka

September
23 September – Gina-Lisa Lohfink, actress and model

October
26 October – René Rast, racing driver
28 October – Kristina Bröring-Sprehe, Olympic equestrian

November
12 November – Robert Müller, footballer

December
9 December – Miriam Welte, Olympic cyclist
13 December – Christian Engelhart, racing driver

Deaths
January 23 - Joseph Beuys, artist (born 1921)
January 25 - Josef Kammhuber, general (born 1896)
January 25 - Ernst Schnabel, German writer (born 1913)
January 27 – Lilli Palmer, actress (born 1914)
February 3 — Alfred Vohrer, German film director and actor (born 1914)
March 11 - Herbert Runge, German boxer (born 1913)
March 13 - Eugen Gerstenmaier, German politician (born 1906)
March 17 - Heinz Nixdorf, German computing pioneer, businessman and founder of Nixdorf Computer AG (born 1925)
June 9 - Elisabeth Selbert, politician and lawyer (born 1896)
July 14 - Joseph Vogt, classical historian (born 1895)
July 24 - Willy Kaiser, German boxer (born 1912)
August 3 - Otmar Emminger, German economist (born 1911)
September 30 - Franz Burda I, German publisher (born 1903)
October 4 — Arno von Lenski, German officer (born 1893)
October 30 - Fritz Tillmann, German actor (born 1910)
October 30 - Elisabeth Schwarzhaupt, German politician (born 1901)
November 12 - Ria Baran, German pair skater (born 1922)
December 2 - Heinrich Amersdorffer, German painter and printmaker (born 1905)
December 12 - Paul Verner, politician (born 1911)
December 19 - Werner Dankwort, German diplomat (born 1895)

See also
1986 in German television

References

 
Years of the 20th century in Germany
1980s in Germany
Germany
Germany